Roberto Bergersen (born January 6, 1976) is an American former professional basketball player who played the majority of his career for the Idaho Stampede in the Continental Basketball Association and the NBA Development League. A 6'6" swingman from Boise State University, he was selected by the Atlanta Hawks with the 52nd overall pick of the 1999 NBA draft. His rights were later traded to the Portland Trail Blazers, where he signed with them but was released before playing in a regular season game for them.

On November 14, 2014, Bergersen's number 11 jersey was retired by the Idaho Stampede.

Bergersen currently resides in Boise, Idaho with his family and is the Director of Basketball Curriculum at Hoop Dreams, a local all-star travel basketball team for boys and girls.

References

External links
RealGM.com Profile
NBA D-League Profile
Eurobasket.com Profile

1976 births
Living people
American expatriate basketball people in Belgium
American expatriate basketball people in France
American expatriate basketball people in Italy
American expatriate basketball people in South Korea
American expatriate basketball people in Spain
American expatriate basketball people in Turkey
American men's basketball players
Atlanta Hawks draft picks
Basketball players from Seattle
Belfius Mons-Hainaut players
Boise State Broncos men's basketball players
Idaho Stampede players
Idaho Stampede (CBA) players
JDA Dijon Basket players
Karşıyaka basketball players
Limoges CSP players
Melilla Baloncesto players
Olimpia Milano players
Shooting guards
Small forwards
Southern Idaho Golden Eagles men's basketball players
Washington Huskies men's basketball players
Wonju DB Promy players